This is a list of major fault lines and fault zones in Slovenia.

Brežice Fault
Donat Fault
Hochstuhl Fault
Idrija Fault
Kneža Fault
Labot Fault (Lavanttal Fault)
Orlica Fault
Periadriatic Seam
Predjama Fault
Raša Fault
Ravne Fault
Sava Fault
Šoštanj Fault
Stična Fault
Vodice Fault
Žužemberk Fault

References

Geology of Slovenia
Faults